Lake George or Lake Welaka is a broad and shallow brackish lake on the St. Johns River in the U.S. state of Florida.

Geography

The St. Johns River flows out of the lake at the north end at Rocky Point.  To the west of this is Salt Cove, taking the flow from Salt Creek.  Just south of Salt Cove is Lisk Point, named for a Dr. Lisk who built a house near the point.  Steamboats coming down from Jacksonville made a counter clockwise loop around the lake with their first stop at Lisk Point.

Lake George is the second largest lake in Florida, after Lake Okeechobee. Lake George was the third largest lake behind Lake Apopka, but conversion of the littoral zone on the northern side of Lake Apopka to farm fields in the previous century reduced its surface area.

History

The name of Lake Welaka is taken from "Welaka" (meaning "chain of lakes"), the name for the St. Johns River in the language of the Timucua, who inhabited the region prior to European settlement.  The first European to visit the lake was Pedro Menéndez de Avilés, who as the Spanish governor of Florida, explored the St. Johns River in the spring of 1596.

Later, the Florida territory was sold to Britain.  The royal botanist in America to King George III, John Bartram, explored the St. Johns River in 1765.  It was John Bartram who gave the lake the name Lake George, in honor of his king.

In more recent years, Lake George has been home to an operational U.S. Military bombing and aerial mining range.  The range is affiliated with the U.S. Navy's Pinecastle Bombing Range located in the Ocala National Forest just west of Lake George. The bombing ranges date back to World War II, when the Navy built bomb targets in Lake George and nearby Crescent Lake, and stationed personnel in the area to maintain the targets and perform search and rescue operations for downed pilots.  Today, the range is under the operational control of nearby Naval Air Station Jacksonville.

The lake also hosts a wide variety of wildlife ranging from migratory water birds and alligators to a number of normally marine animals. Local springs in Lake George (and throughout the St Johns River) impart enough salt to the system to make the habitat suitable to resident and migratory marine species like Atlantic stingray, various species of mullet, striped bass and blue crabs. There is a large enough blue crab population to support a local fishery, making it one of the only fresh water blue crab fisheries in the world.

See also
St. Johns River
Drayton Island

References
 Dreggors, W. and J. Hess.  A Century of West Volusia County: 1860–1960, published by the West Volusia Historical Society, Volusia Co. Fl.
 Ferguson, G.E., et al. (1947).  Springs of Florida.  Geological Bulletin No. 31.  Florida Geological Survey.
 Johnson, M.R. and Snelson, F.F. Jr. (1996) Reproductive Life History of the Atlantic Stingray, Dasyatis Sabina (Pisces, Dasyatidae) in the Freshwater  of Conservation Marine Laboratory, St. Petersburg Fl.
 LaRocque, Kaylee (2006).  Florida bombing Range helps pilots hone skills.  JaxAirNews.com.  accessed 19-Feb-07.
 McLane. W.M. (1955).  The Fishes of the St Johns River System.  PhD. Dissertation.  University of Florida, August, 1955.
 Tagatz, M.E. (1965).  The Fishery for Blue Crabs in the St. Johns River, Florida, with Special Reference to Fluctuation in Yield Between 1961 and 1962.  Special Scientific Report No. 501. US Dept of Interior, Fish and Wildlife Service.

External links
St. Johns River Water Management District
St. Johns River Watershed Site - Florida DEP
http://www.jimporter.org/lakes/george/

George
George
St. Johns River
George
Ocala National Forest